Wiesen is a town in the district of Mattersburg in the Austrian state of Burgenland.

Population

References

Cities and towns in Mattersburg District